"I Never Told You" is a song by the American pop singer-songwriter Colbie Caillat from her second album Breakthrough (2009). The song was released on February 16, 2010 in the United States as the second single.
The song is a power ballad in E-flat major and was written by Caillat, Jason Reeves and Kara DioGuardi and produced by DioGuardi. The song talks about the love the singer still has for her lover they felt strongly about at one point in their life. The song received positive reviews from music critics. 
In the charts, the song has performed moderately well, it has peaked at #48 on the Billboard Hot 100 and #3 on the Adult Pop Songs.

Background
In 'I Never Told You,' Colbie Caillat reveals she still has feelings for a previous love and misses him.
Caillat originally penned this song while touring Europe in her hotel bathroom. She told Starpulse.com: "I wrote it about someone I had broken up with that I was missing at the time." Later, the song was completed during a three-week "writing camp" in Hawaii that Caillat organized with fellow singer/songwriter Jason Reeves and American Idol judge Kara DioGuardi.

Critical reception
In the review of the album, Sal Cinquemani from Slant Magazine said that "Kara DioGuardi deserves some credit for helping Caillat deliver one of her most emotive performances to date on the melancholy "I Never Told You"; on any other record, the song would be easily tagged as mediocre filler, but here it's an album highlight".

Promotion
Colbie began promoting the song on the Jimmy Kimmel Live! show on January 8, 2010.
Later, she appeared on The Tonight Show with Jay Leno on March 11, 2010.

Music video
The official music video was directed by Roman White, and released on Vevo.com on April 2, 2010. 

It involves scenes of Colbie singing while painting, couples breaking apart but eventually were brought back again including herself and her love interest. The music video uses a different mix of the song (the "Single Mix") which is shorter than the Album Version and repeats the line "Oh no, I never told you" towards the end of the song. This version of the song was released by Promo Only in July 2010. The music video has also landed in the number #1 spot on the VH1 Top 20 Video Countdown. She has gone to #1 twice on different occurrences during the show.

Chart performance
The song debuted at #99 on the Billboard Hot 100 chart on the week ending of April 10, 2010 and moved up to #48.

The song was a success on the Adult Pop Songs, staying for 55 weeks, and reaching three. The song peaked on #11 on Adult Contemporary charts and staying for 40 weeks.

The song charted in the Billboard Radio Songs and peaked at #54, while peaking at #43 on Hot Digital Songs chart.

Because of the very heavy airplay, the song ended up as the #4 Hot Adult Pop Songs year-end chart. "I Never Told You" was certified Gold by the Recording Industry Association of America (RIAA).

Charts

Weekly charts

Year-end charts

Release history

References 

2000s ballads
2009 songs
2010 singles
Colbie Caillat songs
Music videos directed by Roman White
Pop ballads
Folk ballads
Songs written by Kara DioGuardi
Songs written by Jason Reeves (songwriter)
Songs written by Colbie Caillat
Universal Republic Records singles
Song recordings produced by Kara DioGuardi